Birkdale is an area of Southport, within the Metropolitan Borough of Sefton, Merseyside, though historically in Lancashire, in the north-west of England. The area is located on the Irish Sea coast, approximately a mile away from the centre of Southport. From 1894 to 1912, Birkdale and the adjoining suburb/village of Ainsdale were administered by Birkdale Urban District Council before becoming part of the county borough of Southport. Until 1 April 1974, Birkdale lay in the traditional borders of the county of Lancashire. At the 2001 census, the local government ward called Birkdale had a population of 12,265. The population of the area at the 2011 Census is shown under Birkdale (ward) (qv). Other parts of Birkdale are included in Dukes wardwhich contains a significant part of the village centre and the Royal Birkdale Golf ClubKew  and Ainsdale wards.

Etymology
Birkdale probably takes its name from two Old Norse words, birki meaning "birch-copse" and dalr meaning "dale" or "valley".

Governance
Birkdale is part of the Southport constituency for elections to the Parliament of the United Kingdom, it is currently represented by the Conservative Party MP, Damien Moore.

For elections to Sefton Council Birkdale acts as a single electoral ward, it currently has three councillors, their names are Iain Brodie - Browne, Richard Hands, and Simon Shaw, all are members of the Liberal Democrats.

Demography
On the whole it is a wealthy area featuring many large Victorian and Edwardian houses; many of the houses have not yet been broken up into individual flats, and still house families. The area is almost entirely residential, with mainly semi-detached houses as the norm.  In the summer of 2003, the average property price was £149,550 (just under £10,000 less than the national average). This has risen to £200,844 in July 2005, more than £20,000 over the national mix-adjusted national average house price. The area has been a popular area with footballers from local Merseyside or Lancashire clubs.

Birkdale Village is on Liverpool Road and features a variety of shops, bars and restaurants. Birkdale railway station is situated on the Northern Line of the Merseyrail network, that links Southport to Liverpool.

Sport
Despite its small size, Birkdale receives a great deal of sporting attention once every few years as it plays host to The Open Championship. It was last played at the Royal Birkdale golf course in July 2017. To lesser fame, the home ground of the Southport and Birkdale Cricket Club on Trafalgar Road is used for county level cricket matches approximately once a year. Southport and Birkdale squash club also play here and are in the North West Counties Squash League.

Red Rum, a racehorse who was trained by Ginger McCain, had his stables in Upper Aughton Road in Birkdale, while a horse named after the village took part and finished tenth in the 2002 Grand National. Birkdale United AFC played a crucial part in the footballing education of Premiership footballers such as Jack Rodwell, Dominic Matteo, Shaun Teale and Paul Dalglish, and still has its home in the village, boasting teams for boys from the age of 6 and girls from the age of 7 through to open age teams. The club was also presented the FA's highest accolade in January 2008, becoming the first FA Charter Community Club in Southport.

Education
Birkdale has three secondary schools, Christ the King Catholic High School, which has around 1200 pupils including sixth form students, Birkdale High School which is for boys, and Greenbank High School (in the part of Birkdale known as Hillside) for girls.

Transport
Birkdale is served by frequent buses run by Arriva North West (to Southport, Formby and Liverpool), Cumfybus, and Stagecoach Merseyside (to Liverpool and Preston). Birkdale has two stations, Birkdale and Hillside which are on the Northern Line of the Merseyrail network.

Notable people
Richard Corbett MEP lived in Birkdale until the age of 8 and attended Farnborough Road School. 
Novelist J. G. Farrell, twice a Booker Prize winner, was evacuated to Birkdale during WW2
Private Richard George Masters VC, soldier awarded the Victoria Cross for actions on 9 April 1918, born in Birkdale
Comedian Lee Mack was a pupil at Birkdale County Junior School
Marcus Morris was vicar of St James' Church, Lulworth Road, in the 1940s and 50s.
Albert Pierrepoint, the most famous British hangman of modern times, lived in Birkdale in later life and had a tobacconist's shop in Birkdale village.
Jack Rodwell -Sunderland A.F.C. Midfielder 
A. J. P. Taylor was born in Birkdale in 1906.

See also
Listed buildings in Birkdale
Birkdale Palace Hotel
Birkdale Palace railway station

References

External links 

Royal Birkdale Golf Club
Open Golf Tournament Information
Birkdale United AFC
Birkdale High School

Towns and villages in the Metropolitan Borough of Sefton
Districts of England created by the Local Government Act 1894
Southport